Diskin may refer to:

 Diskin Orphanage, also known as "Diskin Orphan Home" - founded by Rabbi Yehoshua Leib Diskin
 Diskin (surname)